"We Are" is a song by the Swedish rock singer Ana Johnsson from her worldwide debut album, The Way I Am. The song was released as her first worldwide single and the first from the album in June 2004. It was also included on the soundtrack for Spider-Man 2. "We Are" remains Johnsson's highest-charting hit, becoming a top-10 hit in Austria, Denmark, Italy, Norway, Sweden, and the United Kingdom.

Music video
The music video was shot in Los Angeles at the Nate Starkman & Son building (Pan Pacific Warehouse), and it was directed by Antti Jokinen. The video mixes clips from Spider-Man 2 with a romantic scenario involving Ana Johnsson and a man from the apartment next door. To convey the intensity of Johnsson's performance, the producer created an effect where the loudness of the music seems to cause the furnishings of the man's apartment to slide across the floor.

Track listings
Scandinavian CD single
 "We Are" (video version) – 3:57
 "We Are" (radio version) – 3:54
 "We Are" (location mix) – 3:59

European CD single
 "We Are" (video version) – 3:57
 "We Are" (location mix) – 3:59

European maxi-CD single
 "We Are" (video version) – 3:57
 "We Are" (radio version) – 3:54
 "We Are" (location mix) – 3:59
 "The Way I Am" (alternate acoustic mix) – 3:26
 "We Are" (music video)
 Spider-Man 2 content

UK CD single
 "We Are" (radio version) – 3:54
 "Cuz I Can" – 3:03
 "Bring It On" – 2:45
 "We Are" (original version video)

Charts

Weekly charts

Year-end charts

Certifications

Release history

References

Ana Johnsson songs
2004 singles
2004 songs
Bonnier Music singles
Columbia Records singles
Epic Records singles
Songs from Spider-Man films
Songs written by Andreas Carlsson
Songs written by Jörgen Elofsson
Spider-Man (2002 film series)